Claës Henrik Magnus König (15 January 1885 – 25 November 1961) was a Swedish nobleman, officer, Crown Equerry (1935–1946) and horse rider, who competed in the 1920 Summer Olympics and in the 1924 Summer Olympics.

In 1920 he and his horse Tresor were part of the Swedish equestrian team, which won the gold medal in the team jumping event in Antwerp. Four years later he and his horse Bojar won the silver medal with the Swedish eventing team after finishing fifth in the individual eventing in Paris.

References

1885 births
1961 deaths
Swedish event riders
Swedish show jumping riders
Olympic equestrians of Sweden
Swedish male equestrians
Equestrians at the 1920 Summer Olympics
Equestrians at the 1924 Summer Olympics
Olympic gold medalists for Sweden
Olympic silver medalists for Sweden
Olympic medalists in equestrian
Medalists at the 1924 Summer Olympics
Medalists at the 1920 Summer Olympics
Swedish Army officers